Relativity may refer to:

Physics
 Galilean relativity, Galileo's conception of relativity
 Numerical relativity, a subfield of computational physics that aims to establish numerical solutions to Einstein's field equations in general relativity
 Principle of relativity, used in Einstein's theories and derived from Galileo's principle
 Theory of relativity, a general treatment that refers to both special relativity and general relativity 
 General relativity, Albert Einstein's theory of gravitation
 Special relativity, a theory formulated by Albert Einstein, Henri Poincaré, and Hendrik Lorentz
 Relativity: The Special and the General Theory, a 1920 book by Albert Einstein

Social sciences
 Linguistic relativity
 Cultural relativity
 Moral relativity

Arts and entertainment

Music 
 Relativity Music Group, a Universal subsidiary record label for releasing film soundtracks
 Relativity Records, an American record label 
 Relativity (band), a Scots-Irish traditional music quartet 1985–1987
 Relativity (Emarosa album), 2008
 Relativity (Indecent Obsession album), 1993
 Relativity (Walt Dickerson album) or the title song, 1962
 Relativity, an EP by Grafton Primary, 2007

Television 
 Relativity (TV series), a 1996–1997 American drama series
 "Relativity" (Farscape), an episode
 "Relativity" (Star Trek: Voyager), an episode

Other 
 Relativity (M. C. Escher), a 1953 lithograph print by M. C. Escher
 Relativity Media, an American film production company

Business
 Relativity Space, an American aerospace manufacturing company.

See also

 Relative (disambiguation)
 Relativism, a family of philosophical, religious, and social views